The George and Virginia Trout House is a historic house in Wamego, Kansas, U.S., that was built in 1896. It was designed in the Queen Anne style architectural style. It has been listed on the National Register of Historic Places since January 8, 2014.

References

Buildings and structures in Pottawatomie County, Kansas
Houses completed in 1896
1896 establishments in Kansas
Houses on the National Register of Historic Places in Kansas
Queen Anne architecture in Kansas